Alexandra Shimo is a Canadian writer, who was a shortlisted nominee for the Governor General's Award for English-language non-fiction at the 2014 Governor General's Awards as cowriter of Edmund Metatawabin's memoir Up Ghost River: A Chief's Journey Through the Turbulent Waters of Native History. The book describes Metatawabin's life during and after St. Anne's, a residential school in Fort Albany, northern Ontario, a place where there was a home-made electric chair to punish the children. The school is considered one of the worst in North America, where children were regularly sexually and physically abused. The book became a national bestseller, and was named one of the best books of 2014 by the Canadian Broadcasting Corporation, The Hill Times and Quill and Quire. In February 2015, it was named one of the winners of the CBC's Bookie Awards.

Alex spent her formative years in London, attending St. Paul's Secondary School in Islington before attending Oxford University.

In 2016, Shimo published Invisible North: The Search for Answers on a Troubled Reserve. Based on first person reportage of the four months Shimo lived in Kashechewan First Nation reserve in northern Ontario, the book describes how inhuman conditions had decimated the local community and the legal, economic and political circumstances that trap many northern indigenous communities in poverty. The book was longlisted for the RBC Taylor Prize, and a finalist for the BC Award for Canadian Non-Fiction. It was one of the Globe and Mail's best books of the year.

A former editor at Maclean's, Shimo is a freelance journalist who has contributed to The Guardian, the Toronto Star, the Canadian Broadcasting Corporation, Maclean's, the National Post, The Globe and Mail and Toronto Life, she is also the author of The Environment Equation: 100 Factors That Can Add to or Subtract From Your Total Carbon Footprint.

An out lesbian, she is the partner of activist Lia Grimanis. She also serves on the advisory board of Grimanis' charitable organization Up With Women.

She teaches creative nonfiction part-time at University of Toronto Continuing Studies.

Awards
FINALIST 2017 – BC Achievement Award for Non Fiction 

WINNER 2016 - Speaker's Book Award 

WINNER 2015 – CBC Books Bookie Award for Non-Fiction 

WINNER 2015 – Ontario Historical Society's Donald Grant Creighton Award

FINALIST 2014 – Governor General's Literary Award for Non-Fiction

FINALIST 2015–2016 – Trillium Book Award

FINALIST 2015–2016 – First Nation Communities Read

Works
The Environment Equation: 100 Factors That Can Add to or Subtract From Your Total Carbon Footprint (2008)
Up Ghost River: A Chief's Journey Through the Turbulent Waters of Native History (2014)
Invisible North: The Search for Answers on a Troubled Reserve (2016)

References

External links
Alexandra Shimo

Canadian newspaper reporters and correspondents
Canadian magazine writers
First Nations women writers
Writers from Toronto
Living people
Canadian LGBT journalists
Canadian lesbian writers
LGBT First Nations people
21st-century Canadian non-fiction writers
21st-century Canadian women writers
Maclean's writers and editors
21st-century First Nations writers
Canadian women non-fiction writers
Canadian women columnists
Year of birth missing (living people)
21st-century Canadian LGBT people